The Tirucherai Sivasthalam is a Tevara sthalam located in the village of Tirucherai near Kudavasal in Tiruvarur district, Tamil Nadu, India. The Sivasthalam encloses a Gnanaparameswarar Temple, in which the presiding deity is the Hindu god Shiva. Nayanmars Appar and Campantar have sung in praise of the deity.

Significance 
It is one of the shrines of the 275 Paadal Petra Sthalams.

References 

 
 

Shiva temples in Tiruvarur district
Padal Petra Stalam